Carl Gottfried Seuerling (1727-1795)  was a German born, Swedish stage actor and theater director.  He was the director of the Seuerling theater Company in 1768-93 and as such the leader of one of only two professional Swedish language theater companies in Sweden of the era.

Life
Carl Seuerling was originally from Germany  and arrived to Sweden as the leader of a travelling theater company in 1760.  He married the Swedish actress Margareta Seuerling (1747–1820) in 1768  and took over the theater company of her father, Peter Lindahl (1712–1792).

The  Seuerling travelling theater company performed all over Sweden and Finland, and was in many parts they visited the first theater performing.  Historically, they have not been described as a theater company of great quality - they often experienced a shortage of staff, inexperienced actors and performed in conditions which did not give the chance of high quality scenery, the strong German accent of Carl Seuerling was caricatured, and anecdotes of failed performances circulated, particularly among the upper classes.  However, these judgement are likely overreactions from an elite audience used to the theatres in the capital; in the provincial press, the company are often given positive reviews, and they were popular among the public in the towns and the countryside in which they toured, playing a pioneering role in Swedish theater history.

Seuerling introduced the works of William Shakespeare on the Swedish stage by staging the first performance of Romeo and Juliet at the Egges theater in Norrköping 5 August 1776, with himself and his wife in the main parts.

In 1793 Carl Seuerling left his theater to  Johan Peter Lewenhagen  (1770-1832). However, after his death in 1795, his wife took over the company.

Seuerling had seven children. He was the father of Carl Fredrik Seuerling (d. 1831), the actor Gustaf Wilhelm Seuerling, the school teacher Gottfrid Ferdinand Seuerling (1775-1826), the actress  Carolina Seuerling  (1769-1821), the musician Charlotta Seuerling and the governess Gustafva Margaretha Seuerling (1786-1863).

References

Other sources
 Schöldström, Birger (1889). Seuerling och hans "comædietroupp" : ett blad ur svenska landsortsteaterns historia. Stockholm. Libris 281714

1727 births
1795 deaths
Swedish theatre directors
18th-century Swedish male actors
Age of Liberty people
18th century in Turku
18th-century theatre managers